Clover Hill is a historic home located at Brookeville, Montgomery County, Maryland, United States. It is a large, -story, five bay Italianate-style residence principally built about 1857, with evidence of several earlier building campaigns, including a log dwelling from the mid 18th century. The ruins of a large bank barn and a stone springhouse stand on the property. The house was built by Ephraim Gaither, a Maryland legislator (1817–1820) and locally prominent citizen.

Clover Hill was listed on the National Register of Historic Places in 1982.

References

External links
, including photo in 2004, at Maryland Historical Trust website

Houses on the National Register of Historic Places in Maryland
Houses completed in 1857
Houses in Montgomery County, Maryland
Italianate architecture in Maryland
National Register of Historic Places in Montgomery County, Maryland
1857 establishments in Maryland